Leo Johnson is a character in Channel 4 television soap opera Brookside.  He was played by Leeon Sawyer when the character arrived on the Close in March 1990 until September 1996. Then, Steven Cole took over the role from December 1996 where his character stayed until his departure in April 2001.

Storylines

The Johnsons
The Johnsons are first introduced in 1989 when Terry Sullivan (Brian Regan) asks Mick Johnson (Louis Emerick) to go into partnership with him in his taxi business.  Mick moves in to the Close with son Leo and daughter Gemma (Naomi Kamanga) in 1990, lodging with Harry Cross (Bill Dean) and later renting their house from Harry when he moves to St Helens. For many years the stories revolved around Mick, his brother Ellis (Francis Johnson) and cousin Jerome (Leon Lopez), while Leo and Gemma only played incidental roles.

Joining the police
In 2000 at the age of 18, Leo decided he wanted to join the police force, as Rod Corkhill (Jason Hope) had done at that age in 1987.  His father Mick was proud of his sons career choice and Leo was accepted and got a place in police college in London.

Adele Murray
Before leaving for police college, Leo attended a party held at the Murray's.  Fifteen-year-old Adele (Katy Lamont) had fancied Leo for some time.  After he witnessed his girlfriend flirting with his neighbour Jimmy Corkhill (Dean Sullivan), Leo started to drink heavily and then was seduced by Adele and the two had unprotected sex.  Leo regretted having done so immediately and worried that if anyone were to find out it could compromise his career in the police.

Leo started dating Adele for a while then shortly afterwards, he finished with her. When Mick found a letter to Leo from Adele, he questioned his son and discovered that Leo and Adele had sex. Mick was furious and afterwards, told Leo that he should face up to his responsibilities. After realising however that this could end his career in the police he decided the best thing was for Leo to move to London as soon as possible. Shortly afterwards Leo left.

Adele's pregnancy and termination
Adele decided that she did not wish to continue with the pregnancy and decided to have an abortion.  Her Catholic stepmother Diane (Bernie Nolan) was opposed to this but her father, Marty (Neil Caple), supported thweidea.  Mick and Marty ended up fighting in the Close over the issue.  When Mick told Leo, however, Leo was supportive and said he would bring-up the child and support Adele.  Despite Leo's promise Adele was determined to go ahead with the abortion and had a termination, later leaving the Close to attend the University of Leeds.  Shortly afterwards Mick also left the close for London.

References

Brookside characters
Fictional British police officers
Fictional Black British people
Television characters introduced in 1990
British male characters in television
Fictional English people